

Medalists

Standings

Men's Competition

Women's Competition

References

2009 in volleyball
Sports at the 2009 Mediterranean Games
Volleyball at the Mediterranean Games
Mediterranean Games